Jaspreet Jasz (born Jaspreet Singh Kohli in New Delhi, India) is an Indian singer whose vocals have been featured in Bollywood and Telugu cinema, as well as advertisement jingles. He won recognition through the music reality television series Indian Idol.

Early years
Jasz began to sing at the age of four and would perform in functions and competitions. As a child, he would riyaaz, practicing guitar and harmonium while others of his age would play outside. During his teenage years he won various trophies and awards for performing in his school band as the lead vocalist.

Career
Jasz moved to Mumbai soon after college as a result of the exposure he received on Indian Idol. He stepped into the world of playback singing in 2006 with the Bollywood film, Dil Kabaddi. He followed with his first project with A.R. Rahman, the title track of the movie Blue.

Jasz was introduced to a global audience with Rahman's "Nimma Nimma" which featured in the Isles of Wonder sequence directed by Danny Boyle at the 2012 Summer Olympics.

Discography

Hindi songs

Telugu songs

Awards and nominations 

 Nominated for "Best Playback Singer" in Maa Music Awards 2013.
 Nominated for "Fresh New Voice" in Mirchi Music Awards 2011.

References

External links

Indian male singers
Living people
Indian Sikhs
People from New Delhi
Year of birth missing (living people)
Telugu playback singers
Bollywood playback singers